Christopher Ellery (November 1, 1768December 2, 1840) was a United States senator from Rhode Island. Born in Newport, he graduated from Yale College in 1787, studied law, was admitted to the bar and commenced practice in Newport. He was clerk of the superior court of Newport County from 1794 to 1798.

Early life and family 
Christopher Ellery was a nephew of William Ellery, a Continental Congressman from Rhode Island. In 1784, his daughter, Betsy, married Samuel Vernon.

Slave voyage 
In 1788, Ellery financed a slave voyage aboard the brig Washington with Constant Tabor and prominent Newport slave trader Samuel Vernon, his son in law. The captain, William Gardner, purchased 200 enslaved Africans from the Gold Coast and then sailed to Martinique where he sold 165 people. Thus, 35 may have died on the voyage through the Middle Passage.

Election history 
Ellery was elected as a Democratic-Republican to the U.S. Senate to fill the vacancy caused by the resignation of Ray Greene and served from May 6, 1801, to March 3, 1805. He was defeated for reelection in 1804 by James Fenner, the son of the Governor. Ellery was appointed by President Thomas Jefferson as United States commissioner of loans at Providence in 1806, and was appointed collector of customs at Newport, succeeding his uncle, holding that office from 1820 to 1834.

The Geffroy letters 
In a curious incident in 1801, a letter to President Thomas Jefferson was sent from someone purporting to be Nicholas Geffroy, a silversmith in Newport, Rhode Island. The letter detailed accusations against many citizens and office-holders, and insisted that "A purification is necessary, & we cannot be purified unless you cleanse the Augean Stable completely." Geffroy received a response from Jefferson, but doubted its authenticity and denied having ever written to the President. 

Christopher Ellery, a local resident, vouched for its authenticity and apparently impounded the letter for return to Jefferson. He then accused Congressman John Rutledge Jr. of South Carolina, also then resident in Newport, of having forged this and another letter from Geffroy. These "Geffroy letters" were subsequently published in the Newport Rhode-Island Republican on September 18, 1802, under the headline "Rutledge's Letters To the President of the United States." As noted in that article, although Geffroy possessed some mastery of spoken English, it was doubted that he could write, "with any degree of correctness, a single sentence of the language." After a flurry of accusations and affidavits, Rutledge challenged Ellery to a duel, which he declined. 

Rutledge assaulted Ellery in January 1803, "publicly caning him and pulling him by the nose and ears". Although Rutledge vehemently maintained his innocence in the affair, he decided not to seek reelection in 1803 given the negative publicity.

Death 
Christopher Ellery died in Middletown in 1840. He was buried in Common Burying Ground and Island Cemetery in Newport.

References

1768 births
1840 deaths
Politicians from Newport, Rhode Island
United States senators from Rhode Island
Yale College alumni
Rhode Island Democratic-Republicans
Democratic-Republican Party United States senators